Edvin Sevrin Endresen (born 11 October 1892) was a Norwegian politician.

He was born in Vestre Moland to Engel Endresen and Anna Karlsen. He was elected representative to the Storting for the period 1928–1930, for the Labour Party, and was deputy representative from 1934 to 1936, and from 1937 to 1945.

References

1892 births
Year of death missing
People from Lillesand
Labour Party (Norway) politicians
Members of the Storting